Guido Andreozzi was the defending champion, but lost to compatriot Martín Alund in the quarterfinals.
Top seed Horacio Zeballos won the title defeating Facundo Bagnis 6–7(4–7), 6–3, 6–3.

Seeds

Draw

Finals

Top half

Bottom half

References
 Main Draw
 Qualifying Draw

Lima Challenger - Singles
2013 Singles